Alkalihalobacillus shacheensis is a moderately halophilic bacterium from the genus of Alkalihalobacillus which has been isolated from saline-alkali soil from Shache County.

References

Bacillaceae
Bacteria described in 2014